The 1950 A Group was the second season of the A Football Group, the top Bulgarian professional league for association football clubs, since its establishment in 1948.

Overview
It was contested by 10 teams, and Levski Sofia won the championship.

League standings

Results

Champions
Levski Sofia

Top scorers

References

External links
Bulgaria - List of final tables (RSSSF)
Bulgarian Football Archive - bulgarian-football.com

First Professional Football League (Bulgaria) seasons
Bulgaria
1
Bulgaria
1